Cyclostigma is a genus of extinct plants belonging to the Lycopodiopsida (lycopsids).

Taxonomy
Cyclostigma Haught. was first used by Samuel Haughton in 1859 for the type species C. kiltorkense. The name Cyclostigma has been used for a genus no fewer than four times. Three are synonyms:
Cyclostigma Hochst. ex Endl. is a synonym of Voacanga Thouars. This is the oldest name, dating from 1842, and so would normally have priority but Cyclostigma Haught. has been conserved against it. 
Cyclostigma Klotzsch is a synonym of Croton L.
Cyclostigma Phil. is a synonym of Leptoglossis Benth.

Hao and Xue in 2013 listed Cyclostigma as a lycopsid.

References

Prehistoric lycophytes
Prehistoric lycophyte genera